The 1947–48 season was the forty-sixth season in which Dundee competed at a Scottish national level, and the first season back in the top tier since 1937–38, after winning the Scottish Division B the season prior. In their first season back in the top division, Dundee would have an impressive season and finish 4th, their highest finish in Scottish football since 1921–22.

Dundee would also compete in both the Scottish Cup and the Scottish League Cup. They would have less success in the cups than the league, as they failed to get out of their group in the League Cup, and were knocked out of the Scottish Cup in the 1st round by Heart of Midlothian.

Scottish Division A 

Statistics provided by Dee Archive.

League table

Scottish League Cup 

Statistics provided by Dee Archive.

Group 3

Group 3 table

Scottish Cup 

Statistics provided by Dee Archive.

Player Statistics 
Statistics provided by Dee Archive

|}

See also 

 List of Dundee F.C. seasons

References

External links 

 1947-48 Dundee season on Fitbastats

Dundee F.C. seasons
Dundee